The 2016 Incarnate Word Cardinals football team represented the University of the Incarnate Word in the 2016 NCAA Division I FCS football season. This was the Cardinals' final transition season of collegiate football at the FCS level. They were led by fifth-year head coach Larry Kennan. They played their home games at Gayle and Tom Benson Stadium. They finished the season 3–8, 3–6 in Southland play to finish in a tie for eighth place.

TV and radio
All Incarnate Word games will be broadcast on Texas Sports Radio Network with the voices of Gabe Farias and Shawn Morris. KUIW Radio will also produce a student media broadcast every week, that will be available online, and they will provide streaming of all non-televised home games via UIWtv.

Previous season
The Cardinals finished the season 6–5, 5–4 in Southland play to finish in fourth place.

Schedule
Source:

Personnel

Coaching staff

Roster

Depth chart

Postseason honors
The following Cardinals received postseason honors for the 2016 season:

All-Southland Conference Second-Team
AP  Kody Edwards - Junior
LB  Josh Zellars - Senior

All-Southland Conference Honorable Mention
OL  Draven Taylor - Junior
PR  Jordan Hicks - Senior

Game summaries

Texas A&M–Kingsville

Sources: Box Score

@ Northwestern State

Sources: Box Score

@ Nicholls

Sources: Box Score

McNeese State

Sources: Box Score

@ Texas State

Sources: Box Score

Sam Houston State

Sources: Box Score

@ Abilene Christian

Sources: Box Score

Stephen F. Austin

Sources: Box Score

Southeastern Louisiana

Sources: Box Score

@ Lamar

Sources: Box Score

Houston Baptist

Sources: Box Score

References

Incarnate Word
Incarnate Word Cardinals football seasons
Incarnate Word Cardinals football